The Cane River National Heritage Area is a United States National Heritage Area in the state of Louisiana. The heritage area is known for plantations featuring Creole architecture, as well as numerous other sites that preserve the multi-cultural history of the area. The heritage area includes the town of Natchitoches, Louisiana and its national historic district. Founded in 1714, it is the oldest community in the territory covered by the Louisiana Purchase. Cane River Creole National Historical Park, including areas of Magnolia and Oakland plantations, also is within the heritage area.

The park and the St. Augustine Catholic Church in Natchez have been included as featured destinations on the state's Louisiana African American Heritage Trail.

The roughly  Cane River National Heritage Area begins just south of Natchitoches and extends south and west for about 35 miles (56 kilometers along Cane River Lake and Interstate 49 to Monette's Ferry. Other sites in the heritage area include the Kate Chopin House and the state historic sites of Los Adaes State Historic Site, Fort Jesup, and Fort St. Jean Baptiste State Historic Site.

External links

Official Cane River National Heritage Area website
National Park Service: Official Cane River Creole National Historical Park website 
Map 
National Park Service: Cane River National Heritage Area — NPS "Discover Our Shared Heritage" Travel Itinerary.
National Park Service: Shared Legacies in Cane River National Heritage Area: Linking People, Traditions, and Landscapes 
Louisiana Travel.com: Louisiana's African American Heritage Trail

 
National Heritage Areas of the United States
Protected areas of Louisiana
Geography of Natchitoches Parish, Louisiana
Louisiana African American Heritage Trail
Louisiana culture
National Park Service areas in Louisiana
Tourist attractions in Natchitoches Parish, Louisiana